Ritter Sport is a brand of chocolate bar from the family-owned Alfred Ritter GmbH & Co. KG, which has its headquarters in Waldenbuch, Germany.

Each  square bar is divided into 16 smaller squares, creating a four-by-four pattern. In 2013 the company introduced a new version divided into 9 bigger squares using a three-by-three pattern. Large bars weighing  and  mini bars are also available, although in fewer varieties.

History
In 1912 Alfred and Clara Ritter founded a chocolate factory in Stuttgart-Bad Cannstatt. Later it introduced its own brand of chocolate, named "Alrika (Alfred Ritter Cannstatt)".

By 1926 the company had 80 employees and had bought their first company truck to transport the chocolate.
When production needs required a factory expansion in 1930, the company moved to Waldenbuch, a site a couple of miles outside Stuttgart. The chocolate brand known today, Ritter's Sport Schokolade, was launched in 1932 after Clara suggested creating a chocolate bar that would fit into any sport jacket pocket without breaking but weighed the same as a normal bar.

The Second World War halted production and Ritter chocolates disappeared until the 1950s, when chocolate rationing was ended in West Germany. The end of chocolate rationing did not mark the end of troubles for the firm since in 1952 the company's founder, Albert Ritter, died. His son, Alfred Otto Ritter, took over and focused the company on the chocolate square.

In 1966 Clara Ritter also died and the company was left solely in the hands of Alfred Otto. He dispensed with many other product lines in order to push the square bar.

The 1970s saw Ritter packaging become more colourful with a brighter unique colour assigned to each flavour. The brighter labels were seen in parallel with colour television, on which Ritter advertised. Another advance in packaging came with the snap-open pack (called the 'Knick-Pack'), which Ritter marketed as "practical and modern".

After Alfred Otto Ritter's death the company was managed by his wife, Marta, and in 1978 the company passed into the hands of the third generation, brother and sister Alfred T. Ritter and Marli Hoppe-Ritter.

In 1990 they launched project(s) "Cacaonica", which supports organic cocoa agriculture and reafforestation in Nicaragua, and "Ritter Solar", now the European market leader of solar thermal products and large solar thermal systems.  The Ritter company owns a CHP power plant, which supplies 70% of the factory's energy needs, and since 2002 the company has been run entirely on renewable energy. The monomaterial chocolate packaging is designed to minimize its ecological footprint and is recyclable. The company has been certified to ZNU standard.

The Ritter Museum, opened in 2005, contains the collection of Marli Hoppe-Ritter, which consists of nearly 600 paintings, objects, sculptures and graphic works, a breadth of painterly and sculptural confrontation with the square form used as the design for the Ritter chocolate. The museum is an extension of the factory's 'ChocoShop', which was opened in 2001. The museum, on Alfred-Ritter-Straße 27, is a cubical building with limestone wall covering; a 12-metre-high central open passage is meant to draw in the landscape, and the large window allows a view through the building. It was designed by Max Dudler and Susanne Raupach.

On the whole their products are neither certified organic nor certified fair trade. However, in April 2008 they launched an organic product line called "Ritter Sport Bio".

The firm celebrated its centenary in 2012 by touring 19 German cities between March and September on 'the Colourful ChocoTour'. A limited-edition anniversary bar was released: Edel-Nuss Mix – Plain milk chocolate with macadamias, cashews, and almonds. Also in 2012 Ritter expanded its initiative in Nicaragua by setting up a new cocoa plantation. The first harvest was in 2017.

In 2013 Ritter opened another shop at Ravensburger Spieleland, a German theme park, and the next year Ritter's first pop-up shop appeared in Hamburg for four months.

In 2017 Ritter released its first certified vegan bars, Dunkle Voll-Nuss Amaranth (hazelnut cream chocolate with amaranth and nuts) and Dunkle Mandel Quinoa (hazelnut cream chocolate with quinoa and almonds). As of February 2017 they were on sale only in Germany. The new releases, costing €2 each, target the growing vegan population in Germany. A third bar, Sesam (almond cream chocolate with sesame), was released in February 2020.

In July 2018 Ritter announced its intention to attempt to release the Schoko & Gras variety, a milk chocolate with roasted hemp seed filling, in the United States for World Cannabis Day 2019, retitled 'Choco & Weed'. As of January 2019 it had yet to be approved for sale.

In 2018 Ritter released a limited edition bar made from the first viable harvest of their Nicaraguan cocoa plantation. It was limited to 30,000 bars and was available in the SchokoShop in Waldenbuch, SchokoWelt Berlin and online.

On the 29 March 2022, Ritter announced it would continue sales to Russia, despite the invasion of Ukraine. The Russian market accounts for about 7% of the company's turnover. Ritter announced that it would halt all investment and advertising in Russia.

Varieties

 Vollmilch – Plain milk chocolate (Royal Blue Wrapper, see image)
 Schoko-Duo – Plain milk chocolate and white chocolate (Royal Blue Wrapper with chocolate bar on outside)
 Dunkle Vollmilch – Plain medium dark chocolate, 40% cacao (Azure Blue Wrapper)
 Halbbitter – Plain dark chocolate, 50% cacao (Burgundy Wrapper)
 Die Milde – Plain dark chocolate from Ghana, 55% cacao (Blue/pink Wrapper)
 Die Feine – Plain dark chocolate from Nicaragua, 61% cacao (Yellow/blue Wrapper)
 Edel-bitter – Plain dark chocolate from Ecuador, 71% cacao (Pink Wrapper)
 Edel-bitter – Plain dark chocolate from Ecuador, 73% cacao (Black Wrapper)
 Die Kräftige – Plain dark chocolate from Peru, 74% cacao (Orange/blue Wrapper)
 Die Starke – Plain dark chocolate from Ghana, 81% cacao (Green/purple Wrapper)
 Knusperkeks – Milk chocolate with a butter biscuit (Brown Wrapper)
 Pfefferminz – Chocolate with peppermint filling (Caribbean Green Wrapper)
 Joghurt – Yogurt (White Wrapper, see image)
 Erdbeer Joghurt – Milk chocolate strawberry and yogurt filling (Light Pink Wrapper)
 Voll-Nuss – Milk chocolate with whole hazelnuts (Brown Wrapper with Hazelnut-Pattern)
 Dunkle Voll-Nuss – Dark chocolate with whole hazelnuts (Dark Brown Wrapper with Hazelnut-Pattern)
 Weiße Voll-Nuss – White chocolate with whole hazelnuts (White/Cream Wrapper with Hazelnut-Pattern)
 Knusperflakes – Milk chocolate with corn flakes (Golden Yellow Wrapper)
 Voll Erdnuss – Milk chocolate with whole peanuts (Orange Wrapper)
 Ganze Mandel – Milk chocolate with whole almonds (Dark Green Wrapper)
 Marzipan – Dark chocolate with marzipan center (Red Wrapper, see image)
 Cocos – Milk chocolate with flakes of coconut in the center (Silver Wrapper)
 Trauben-Nuss – Milk chocolate with raisins and hazelnut pieces (Carmine Red Wrapper)
 Rum Trauben Nuss – Milk chocolate with rum-soaked raisins and hazelnut pieces (Crimson Red Wrapper)
 Cappuccino – Milk chocolate and cappuccino cream (Amber Wrapper)
 Alpenmilch – Special milk chocolate with high alpine milk proportion (Sky Blue Wrapper)
 Nugat – Milk chocolate with hazelnut-nougat center (Midnight Blue Wrapper)
 Feinherb à la Mousse au Chocolat – dark chocolate filled with chocolate mousse (Bistre Wrapper)
 Williams Birne Trüffel – dark chocolate filled with Poire Williams pear brandy mousse
 Karamel Nuss – Milk Chocolate with butter caramel cream dropped hazelnuts and crispy rice (Golden yellow wrapper)
 Haselnuss – Milk chocolate with chopped hazelnuts (Green wrapper, see image)
Neapolitan – Milk Chocolate with Neapolitan wafers, made with a hazelnut cream filled wafers and praline. (medium dark orange wrapper)
Noisette – Hazelnut-flavored milk chocolate. (light green wrapper)
Kakao-Mousse – Whipped Cream Cocoa in Alpine Milk Chocolate. (Brown Wrapper)
Kakao-Keks – Dark chocolate with cookie center. (Brown Wrapper with cookie background)
Karamell – Milk chocolate with caramel filling. (Orange wrapper)
Olympia – Milk Chocolate with yoghurt, honey, and glucose. (Gold Wrapper)
Honig Salz Mandel – Milk chocolate with salted almonds and honey. (Orange wrapper with chocolate-coated almonds in the background)
Macadamia – Milk chocolate with halved Macadamia nuts. (Blue wrapper with chocolate-coated Macadamia nuts in the background)
Waffel – Milk chocolate with cocoa cream-filled waffle square. (Orange wrapper)
Mandel Orange – Dark chocolate with almond pieces and candied orange peel
Cashew – Milk chocolate with roasted and salted cashew nuts

Organic varieties
 Mandelsplitter – Milk chocolate with chopped almonds.
 Macadamia – Milk chocolate with chopped macadamia nuts.
 Trauben-Cashew – Milk chocolate with chopped cashew nuts and raisins.
 Vollmilch 35% – Milk chocolate with 35% cacao.
 Feinherb 60% – Dark chocolate with 60% cacao.
 Kakaosplitter Nuss – Milk chocolate with 35% cacao, chopped nuts and cocoa kernel chips.

Slogans

Motto 1
German packaging: "Quadratisch. Praktisch. Gut." ("Square. Practical. Good.")
French packaging: "Carré. Pratique. Gourmand."
English packaging (North America & Australasia): "Quality. Chocolate. Squared."
English packaging (UK-Ireland): "Quality in a Square."
Italian packaging: "Quadrato. Pratico. Buono."
Danish packaging: "Kvadratisk. Praktisk. God."
Dutch packaging: "Vierkant. Makkelijk. Lekker."
Russian packaging: "Квадратный. Практичный. Хороший." (Translation of German) or "Квадратиш. Практиш. Гут." (Transliteration of German)
In 2022, this motto was mocked following Ritter's decision to continue sales to Russia. The Ukrainian ambassador to Germany used the Twitter platform to criticise Ritter, using the motto "Square. Practical. Blood".

Motto 2
"Qualität im Quadrat."

Literal translation used on English language packaging: "Quality in a square." English packaging now features "Quality. Chocolate. Squared." to provide a similar description. The company has defended a monopoly on square-packaged chocolate bars.

Motto 3
"Knick Knack auf Zack."

Literal translation in English language would be: "fold and snap to be prepared." The first two terms are the clicking noises that you are supposed to hear when breaking the chocolate bar twice in the middle - knick is from the German verb knicken (to bend something), Knack means snap/click and "auf Zack sein" means on one's toes / ready and waiting / prepared / set / arranged. This motto aired on German TV in the early 1990s.

Mascot
Ritter Sport is sometimes represented by "Quadrago", a banner-carrying baby dragon. This may be partly attributed to the German word "Ritter" meaning "Knight".

Sustainability
In a 2022 research overview carried out by The Chocolate Collective, Ritter Sport scored 23rd out of 35 reviewed chocolate companies with respect to environmental sustainability for chocolate resourcing. The survey's main concerns with Ritter were on deforestation to clear land for cocoa plantations and paying living wages to cocoa farmers. The survey found that the company is not leading the industry in any of the six criteria used in the comparison, but is starting to implement good policies in four of the six categories.

References

External links

 
 Ritter Museum (in German)

German chocolate companies
Chocolate bars
German brands
Brand name chocolate